To the Dankuni Municipality is the civic body that governs Dankuni and its surrounding areas in Srirampore subdivision of Hooghly district, West Bengal, India.

Geography

Dankuni Municipality covers an area of 19.5 sq km and has a total population of 95,966 (2011).

Dankuni Municipality is located in the south-eastern part of Chanditala II CD Block.

Elections
In the 2015 municipal elections for Dankuni Municipality Trinamool Congress won 11 seats, CPI (M) 8 seats, INC 1 seat and  Independent 1 seat.

References

 

Municipalities of West Bengal